Elections to the French National Assembly were held in French Cameroons on 2 June 1946, with a second round of voting on 30 June.

Electoral system
The two seats allocated to the constituency were elected on two separate electoral rolls; French citizens elected one MP from the first college, whilst non-citizens elected one MP in the second college.

Results

First college

Second college

References

Cameroon
1946 06
1946 in French Cameroon
1946 06
Cameroon